Marie-Pierre Gagné (born February 28, 1983) is a Canadian former synchronized swimmer.  She began synchronized swimming at age six. She finished in fourth place at the 2003 world championships at Barcelona, Spain in the free routine combination event. She is also currently studying medicine at Université de Montréal, in Montreal.

She was captain of the Canadian national team and compete at Beijing in 2008 for her second olympics.

References

Sports Reference

1983 births
Living people
Olympic synchronized swimmers of Canada
Synchronized swimmers at the 2004 Summer Olympics
Synchronized swimmers at the 2007 Pan American Games
Synchronized swimmers at the 2008 Summer Olympics
Canadian synchronized swimmers
Swimmers from Montreal
Pan American Games competitors for Canada